Geraldine Aizenberg (born 31 January 1978) is an Argentine former professional tennis player.

Aizenberg reached a best singles ranking of 180 in the world. One of her best performances was a runner-up finish at the $50k Jakarta tournament in 1997. She took part in the qualifying draw for the 1998 US Open.

As a doubles player, Aizenberg won five titles on the ITF Circuit. In 1998, she appeared in the main draw of WTA Tour tournaments in Maria Lankowitz, Palermo, and Sopot.

ITF Circuit finals

Singles: 2 (0–2)

Doubles: 10 (5–5)

References

External links
 
 

1978 births
Living people
Argentine female tennis players